Johann Evangelist Scheffer von Leonhardshoff (30 October 1795, Vienna – 12 January 1822, Vienna) was an Austrian painter and graphic artist associated with the Nazarene movement.

Life 
He belonged to a noble but poor family that originally came from Fulda and was barely more than a child when he began studies at the Academy of Fine Arts, Vienna, under Hubert Maurer. He came under the influence of the Nazarene movement, however, and moved away from the Academic painting style. In 1812, he took a trip to Venice to visit his sister, then went on to Ferrara, which is the place where he may have contracted the tuberculosis that would cause his early death.

When he returned from Italy, he settled in Klagenfurt, where the Prince-bishop of Gurk, became his patron and appointed him Court Painter. In 1814, he was able to undertake another, extensive tour of Italy, during which he was admitted to see Pope Pius VII and received the Supreme Order of Christ for painting the Pope's portrait. After that, his friends jokingly referred to him as "Raffaelino" (Little Raphael). In 1816, he returned to Klagenfurt and fell seriously ill. He moved to Vienna in 1819 and took a last trip to Italy from 1820 to 1821. Back in Vienna he was rejected by his long-time love, Caecilia Bontzak, who felt ignored, and his illness worsened rapidly. He died just a few months after his 26th birthday.

References

Further reading 
 Michael Krapf, Johann Evangelist Scheffer von Leonhardshoff 1795-1822. Ein Mitglied des Lukasbundes in Wien. Vienna: Schroll, 1977 (Exhibition catalog)

External links 

 What It's Worth: Biography
 Jutta Assel @ Goethe Zeit: Johann Evangelist Scheffer von Leonhardshoff, Brief biography and Romantic Allegory
 Grove Art Online: Brief biography
 Arcadja: Works by Leonhardshoff

1795 births
1822 deaths
Austrian painters
Austrian male painters
Nazarene movement